The 2013 Tour of Chongming Island World Cup is the fourth running of the Tour of Chongming Island World Cup, a women's single-day cycling race held in China and is the fifth race of the 2013 UCI Women's Road World Cup season.

Race
Marianne Vos and Ellen van Dijk, the two top leaders in the 2013 UCI Women's Road World Cup classification did not start in this World Cup race.

Results

Source

World Cup standings
Standings after 5 of 8 2013 UCI Women's Road World Cup races.

Individuals

Source

Teams

Source

References

External links

Tour of Chongming Island
Tour of Chongming Island
Tour of Chongming Island